Babu is a former Indian actor who has appeared in leading roles. After making his debut in Bharathiraja's En Uyir Thozhan (1990), the actor appeared in a few more Tamil films before being paralysed following a failed stunt sequence.

Career
Babu made his acting debut in Bharathiraja's 1990 film En Uyir Thozhan, portraying the leading role in a cast featuring rookie actors Thennavan and Rama. About his performance, a critic noted "Babu beautifully essays his character", "understanding the complexities of the character, Babu forcefully brings out the intensity associated with his fanaticism yet never loses the innate guileless nature of Dharma" and "Babu makes the role his own with his body language, unique facial expressions and dialogue delivery". Though the film did not perform well upon release, it has since garnered attention as a "cult classic". He then went on to play the lead role in Vikraman's Perum Pulli (1991) featuring alongside actress Suman Ranganathan and another role in Thayamma (1991). His final release til date was Ponnukku Sethi Vanthachu, which released in late 1991.

Following a stunt sequence gone wrong when shooting for a film, Babu suffered spinal injuries and became paralysed in the early 1990s. He subsequently stopped working as an actor. In 1997, he worked as a dialogue writer for the unreleased film, Smile Please starring Prakash Raj, which would have marked the debut for filmmaker Radha Mohan.

In June 2004, director Ponvannan revealed that he was going to make a film based on the life of his friend, Babu, and that he would use the profits from his film Gomathy Nayagam to fund the venture. However, the film eventually did not materialise.

Filmography

References 

Living people
20th-century Indian male actors
Male actors in Tamil cinema
Year of birth missing (living people)